Lysine demethylase 8 is a protein that in humans is encoded by the KDM8 gene.

Function

This gene likely encodes a histone lysine demethylase. Studies of a similar protein in mouse indicate a potential role for this protein as a tumor suppressor. Alternatively spliced transcript variants have been described.

References

Further reading 

Human proteins